Yeniköy is a village in the Emirdağ District, Afyonkarahisar Province, Turkey. Its population is 447 (2021).

It is a traditional Anatolian village. The head of local government (muhtar) is Abdil Koc (as of 2006).

History

The village was established by Turkish emigrants from the Republic of Nagorno-Karabagh; they emigrated in the Ottoman Empire time and lived first in Davulga. After movings Sons of Alhan to valley of Yenikoy. Became yenikoy as a town.

Yenikoy was home to many Greek people in the 1920s. In 1924 following the dramatic events in the War of Asia Minor, the Greek people fled their village and came to stay in Kondariotissa, a town in Pieria in northern Greece. A memorial sculpture has been erected in the square of the Kondariotissa village, to commemorate the immigration of Greeks from Yenikoy (Νεοχώρι Χηλής in Greek) to Kondariotissa.

It is notable that although more than 80 years have gone by since the immigration, a lot of people from Kondariotissa visit Yenikoy and are welcomed with the friendship and hospitability of the residents and the local authorities of the Turkish town.

References

External links
Yenikoy Info Page

Villages in Emirdağ District